Department of Scientific and Industrial Research, abbreviated DSIR was the name of several British Empire organisations founded after the 1923 Imperial Conference to foster intra-Empire trade and development.
 Department of Scientific and Industrial Research (United Kingdom), a department of the British Government responsible for the organisation, development and encouragement of scientific and industrial research
 Department of Scientific and Industrial Research (New Zealand), a now-defunct government science agency in New Zealand, founded in 1926 and broken into Crown Research Institutes in 1992
 Department of Scientific and Industrial Research (India)

See also 
Commonwealth Scientific and Industrial Research Organisation the parallel organisation in Australia

Government agencies by type
Former disambiguation pages converted to set index articles